Alexey Yuryevich Karpov  is a Russian historian, obshestvoved and culturologist. The editor of the publishing house Molodaya Gvardiya. He is a specialist in the history of ancient Ukraine.

He was awarded many scientific prizes, including the National award "Imperial culture" named after Eduard Volodin and The Patriarchal literary award.

Life 
Karpov was born on may 5 1960 in Moscow.

In 1982, he graduated from the history Department of the Moscow State Pedagogical University. For about 5 years, he worked as a high school history and obshestvovedeny teacher.

In 1987, he got a job as an editor at the Molodaya Gvardiya publishing house. It has been published since 1990.

During his life, Karpov wrote more than 100 historical works; biographies of the rulers of Kievan Rus' became very popular. He became famous for historical biographies of the rulers of ancient Ukraine, primarily the "Orthodox trilogy", which includes books about Princess Olga, Yaroslav the Wise and Vladimir the Great.

Currently lives and works in Moscow.

Honours
«Alexander Nevsky» (2005) — for the book «Grand Duke Alexander Nevsky»
National award «Imperial culture» named after Eduard Volodin (2014) — for the book «Grand Duke Alexander Nevsky»
Winner of the IX competition «Education through the book» (2014) — First degree diploma in the category «The best spiritual and Patriotic book» for the book «Andrey Bogolyubsky»
The Patriarchal literary award (2016) — «for significant contribution to the development of Russian literature»

Main works
2002 – Grand Duke Alexander Nevsky
2004 – Vladimir the Great
2005 – Yaroslav the Wise
2007 – Yuri Dolgoruky
2009 – Princess Olga
2011 – Baty
2013 – Orthodox saints and miracle workers
2014 – Andrey Bogolyubsky
2015 – Grand Duke Vladimir Monomakh
2019 – Vsevolod the big nest
In addition, Karpov is the author of historical books for children, articles on the study of ancient Ukraine and historical research.

References

1960 births
Writers from Moscow
Members of the Congress of People's Deputies of the Soviet Union
21st-century Russian historians
Living people